The list of ship commissionings in 1927 includes a chronological list of all ships commissioned in 1927.


1927
 Ship commissionings